Betbunia is a village in Paikgachha Upazila, Khulna District in the Division of Khulna, Bangladesh.

References

Villages in Khulna Division
Villages in Khulna District